This is a list of the Australian moth species of the family Heliozelidae. It also acts as an index to the species articles and forms part of the full List of moths of Australia.

Heliozela anantia Meyrick, 1897
Heliozela autogenes Meyrick, 1897
Heliozela catoptrias Meyrick, 1897
Heliozela crypsimetalla Meyrick, 1897
Heliozela eucarpa Meyrick, 1897
Heliozela isochroa Meyrick, 1897
Heliozela microphylla Meyrick, 1897
Heliozela nephelitis Meyrick, 1897
Heliozela prodela Meyrick, 1897
Heliozela rutilella (Walker, 1864)
Heliozela siderias Meyrick, 1897
Heliozela trisphaera Meyrick, 1897
Hoplophanes acrozona Meyrick, 1897
Hoplophanes aglaodora (Meyrick, 1897)
Hoplophanes argochalca (Meyrick, 1897)
Hoplophanes chalcolitha Meyrick, 1897
Hoplophanes chalcopetala (Meyrick, 1897)
Hoplophanes chalcophaedra Turner, 1923
Hoplophanes chlorochrysa Meyrick, 1897
Hoplophanes electritis Meyrick, 1897
Hoplophanes haplochrysa Meyrick, 1897
Hoplophanes hemiphragma Meyrick, 1897
Hoplophanes heterospila Meyrick, 1897
Hoplophanes monosema Meyrick, 1897
Hoplophanes niphochalca Meyrick, 1897
Hoplophanes panchalca Meyrick, 1897
Hoplophanes peristera Meyrick, 1897
Hoplophanes phaeochalca Meyrick, 1897
Hoplophanes philomacha Meyrick, 1897
Hoplophanes porphyropla Meyrick, 1897
Hoplophanes semicuprea Meyrick, 1897
Hoplophanes tritocosma Meyrick, 1897
Pseliastis spectropa Meyrick, 1897
Pseliastis trizona Meyrick, 1897
Pseliastis xanthodisca Meyrick, 1897

The following species belongs to the family Heliozelidae, but has not been assigned to a genus yet. Given here is the original name given to the species when it was first described:
Hoplophanes lithocolleta Turner, 1916

External links 
Heliozelidae at Australian Faunal Directory

Australia